Wapping is an area in East London, England.

There are various articles associated with Wapping, London:
 St John's Church, Wapping
 Wapping Autonomy Centre, a short-lived social centre
 Wapping dispute, a strike by print workers
 Wapping Hockey Club, in East London
 Wapping Hydraulic Power Station
 Wapping Old Stairs, a comic opera
 The Wapping Project, an arts organisation
 Wapping railway station
 Wapping Wall, a street in Wapping

Other places
 Wapping Dock, a dock on the River Mersey in Liverpool, England
 Wapping Dock railway station, on the former Liverpool Overhead Railway in Liverpool, England
 Wapping River, a river in the state of Victoria, Australia
 Wapping Tunnel, an old railway tunnel leading to Wapping Dock in Liverpool, England
 Wapping Wharf, a wharf on the floating harbour in Bristol, England

See also
 Battle of Wapping Heights, a battle in Warren County, Virginia, during the American Civil War
 Wappinger, a Native American people from what is now southern New York and western Connecticut